Adam Loomis (born March 19, 1992) is an American Nordic combined skier. He was born in Eau Claire, Wisconsin. He competed in the World Cup 2015 season.

He represented US at the FIS Nordic World Ski Championships 2015 in Falun.

Other notable athlete feats include setting the FKT on the Wasatch Ultimate Ridge Linkup (UT). His record was set on 16 September 2018 with a time of 15 hours 59 minutes. 

Loomis continues as a multi sport athlete living in Alaska where he coaches Nordic combined skiing. He devotes free time to perfecting homemade apple sauce and scouting for 100 kilometer ultramarathon races.

References

External links 
 
 

1992 births
Living people
Sportspeople from Eau Claire, Wisconsin
American male Nordic combined skiers